Abbani  is a village in the southern state of Karnataka, India. It is located in the Kolar taluk of Kolar district in Karnataka.

Notable people
A.N.Prahlada Rao , Author and crossword constructor

See also
 Kolar
 Districts of Karnataka

References

External links
 http://Kolar.nic.in/
 http://www.thehindubusinessline.com/2001/05/14/stories/101444g3.htm

Villages in Kolar district